Sildenafil, sold under the brand name Viagra, among others, is a medication used to treat erectile dysfunction and pulmonary arterial hypertension. It is unclear if it is effective for treating sexual dysfunction in women. It is taken by mouth or by injection into a vein. Onset is typically within twenty minutes and lasts for about two hours.

Common side effects include headaches, heartburn, and flushed skin. Caution is advised in those with cardiovascular disease. Rare but serious side effects include a prolonged erection (priapism) that can lead to damage to the penis, vision problems, and hearing loss. Sildenafil should not be taken by people on nitrates such as nitroglycerin (glycerin trinitrate), as this may result in a serious drop in blood pressure. Sildenafil should not be taken within four hours of taking an alpha blocker.

Sildenafil acts by blocking phosphodiesterase 5 (PDE5), an enzyme that promotes breakdown of cGMP, which regulates blood flow in the penis. It requires sexual arousal to work. It also results in dilation of the blood vessels in the lungs.

Pfizer originally discovered the medication in 1989 while looking for a treatment for heart-related chest pain. It was approved for medical use in the United States and in the European Union in 1998. In 2020, it was the 183rd most commonly prescribed medication in the United States, with more than 2million prescriptions. It is available as a generic medication. In the United Kingdom, it is available over the counter. Most of the Active Pharmaceutical Ingredient (API) in Sildenafil, Sildenafil citrate, is produced in Pfizer's Ringaskiddy complex, County Cork, which is Pfizer's largest production facility outside of the United States.

Medical uses

Sexual dysfunction
The primary indication of sildenafil is treatment of erectile dysfunction (inability to sustain a satisfactory erection to complete sexual intercourse). Its use is now one of the standard treatments for erectile dysfunction, including for men with diabetes mellitus.

Antidepressant-associated sexual dysfunction
Tentative evidence suggests that sildenafil may help men who experience antidepressant-induced erectile dysfunction.

Pulmonary hypertension
While sildenafil improves some markers of disease in people with pulmonary arterial hypertension, it does not appear to affect the risk of death or serious side effects.

Raynaud's phenomenon
Sildenafil and other PDE5 inhibitors are used off-label to alleviate vasospasm and treat severe ischemia and ulcers in fingers and toes for people with secondary Raynaud's phenomenon; these drugs have moderate efficacy for reducing the frequency and duration of vasospastic episodes.  their role more generally in Raynaud's was not clear.

High-altitude pulmonary edema
Sildenafil has been studied for high-altitude pulmonary edema, but its use is currently not recommended for that indication.

Adverse effects
In clinical trials, the most common adverse effects of sildenafil use included headache, flushing, indigestion, nasal congestion, and impaired vision, including photophobia and blurred vision. Some sildenafil users have complained of seeing everything tinted blue (cyanopsia). This cyanopsia can be explained because Sildenafil, while selective for PDE5, does have a minor level of selectivity for PDE6, which is the phosphodiesterase found in the retina. Patients thus taking the drug may experience colorvision abnormalities. Some complained of blurriness and loss of peripheral vision. In July 2005, the U.S. Food and Drug Administration (FDA) updated labeling for Cialis, Levitra and Viagra to reflect a small number of post-marketing reports of sudden vision loss, while acknowledging that "...it is not possible to determine whether these oral medicines for erectile dysfunction were the cause of the loss of eyesight or whether the problem is related to other factors such as high blood pressure or diabetes, or to a combination of these problems." A careful review of pooled data from clinical trials containing well documented information about the dose and duration of exposure to the drug for a large number of patients, yields no evidence for an increased risk of non-arteritic anterior ischemic optic neuropathy or other adverse ocular events associated with PDE-5 inhibitor use. 

Rare but serious adverse effects found through postmarketing surveillance include prolonged erections, severe low blood pressure, myocardial infarction (heart attack), ventricular arrhythmias, stroke, increased intraocular pressure, and sudden hearing loss. In October 2007, the FDA announced that the labeling for all PDE5 inhibitors, including sildenafil, required a more prominent warning of the potential risk of sudden hearing loss.

Interactions 
Care should be exercised by people who are also taking protease inhibitors for the treatment of HIV infection. Protease inhibitors inhibit the metabolism of sildenafil, effectively multiplying the plasma levels of sildenafil, increasing the incidence and severity of side effects. Those using protease inhibitors are recommended to limit their use of sildenafil to no more than one 25 mg dose every 48 hours. Other drugs that interfere with the metabolism of sildenafil include erythromycin and cimetidine, both of which can also lead to prolonged plasma half-life levels.

The use of sildenafil and an α1 blocker (typically prescribed for hypertension or for urologic conditions, such as benign prostatic hypertrophy) at the same time may lead to low blood pressure, but this effect does not occur if they are taken at least 4 hours apart.

Contraindications
Contraindications include:
 Concomitant use of nitric oxide donors, organic nitrites and nitrates, such as:
 nitroglycerin
 isosorbide mononitrate
 isosorbide dinitrate
 sodium nitroprusside
 alkyl nitrites (commonly known as "poppers")
 Concomitant use of soluble guanylyl cyclase stimulators, such as riociguat
 Known hypersensitivity to sildenafil

Sildenafil should not be used if sexual activity is inadvisable due to underlying cardiovascular risk factors.

Nonmedical use

Recreational use
Sildenafil's popularity with young adults has increased over the years. Sildenafil's trade name, Viagra, is widely recognized in popular culture, and the drug's association with treating erectile dysfunction has led to its recreational use. The reasons behind such use include the belief that the drug increases libido, improves sexual performance, or permanently increases penis size. Studies on the effects of sildenafil when used recreationally are limited, but suggest it has little effect when used by those who do not have erectile dysfunction. In one study, a 25 mg dose was shown to cause no significant change in erectile quality, but did reduce the postejaculatory refractory time. This study also noted a significant placebo effect in the control group.

Unprescribed recreational use of sildenafil and other PDE5 inhibitors is noted as particularly high among users of illegal drugs. Sildenafil is sometimes used to counteract the effects of other substances, often illicit. Some users mix it with methylenedioxymethamphetamine (MDMA, ecstasy), other stimulants, or opiates in an attempt to compensate for the common side effect of erectile dysfunction, a combination known as "sextasy", "rockin' and rollin'" or "trail mix". Mixing it with amyl nitrite, another vasodilator, is particularly dangerous and potentially fatal.

Jet lag research
The 2007 Ig Nobel Prize in Aviation went to Patricia V. Agostino, Santiago A. Plano, and Diego A. Golombek of Universidad Nacional de Quilmes, Argentina, for their discovery that sildenafil helps treat jet lag recovery in hamsters.

Sports
Professional athletes have been documented using sildenafil, believing the opening of their blood vessels will enrich their muscles. In turn, they believe it will enhance their performances.

Analogs
Acetildenafil and other synthetic structural analogs of sildenafil which are PDE5 inhibitors have been found as adulterants in a number of "herbal" aphrodisiac products sold over-the-counter. These analogs have not undergone any of the rigorous testing that drugs like sildenafil have passed, and thus have unknown side-effect profiles. Some attempts have been made to ban these drugs, but progress has been slow so far, as, even in those jurisdictions that have laws targeting designer drugs, the laws are drafted to ban analogs of illegal drugs of abuse, rather than analogs of prescription medicines. However, at least one court case has resulted in a product being taken off the market.

The U.S. Food and Drug Administration (FDA) has banned numerous products claiming to be Eurycoma longifolia that, in fact, contain only analogs of sildenafil. Sellers of such fake herbals typically respond by just changing the names of their products.

Detection in biological fluids
Sildenafil and/or N-desmethylsildenafil, its major active metabolite, may be quantified in plasma, serum, or whole blood to assess pharmacokinetic status in those receiving the drug therapeutically, to confirm the diagnosis in potential poisoning victims, or to assist in the forensic investigation in a case of fatal overdose.

Mechanism of action

Sildenafil protects cyclic guanosine monophosphate (cGMP) from degradation by cGMP-specific phosphodiesterase type 5 (PDE5) in the corpus cavernosum. Nitric oxide (NO) in the corpus cavernosum of the penis binds to guanylate cyclase receptors, which results in increased levels of cGMP, leading to smooth muscle relaxation (vasodilation) of the intimal cushions of the helicine arteries. This smooth muscle relaxation leads to vasodilation and increased inflow of blood into the spongy tissue of the penis, causing an erection. Robert F. Furchgott, Ferid Murad, and Louis Ignarro won the Nobel Prize in Physiology or Medicine in 1998 for their independent study of the metabolic pathway of nitric oxide in smooth muscle vasodilation.

The molecular mechanism of smooth muscle relaxation involves the enzyme CGMP-dependent protein kinase, also known as PKG. This kinase is activated by cGMP and it phosphorylates multiple targets in the smooth muscle cells, namely myosin light chain phosphatase, RhoA, IP3 receptor, phospholipase C, and others. Overall, this results in a decrease in intracellular calcium and desensitizing proteins to the effects of calcium, engendering smooth muscle relaxation.

Sildenafil is a potent and selective inhibitor of cGMP-specific phosphodiesterase type 5 (PDE5), which is responsible for degradation of cGMP in the corpus cavernosum. The molecular structure of sildenafil is similar to that of cGMP and acts as a competitive binding agent of PDE5 in the corpus cavernosum, resulting in more cGMP and increased penile response to sexual stimulation. Without sexual stimulation, and therefore lack of activation of the NO/cGMP system, sildenafil should not cause an erection. Other drugs that operate by the same mechanism include tadalafil (Cialis) and vardenafil (Levitra).

Sildenafil is broken down in the liver by hepatic metabolism using cytochrome p450 enzymes, mainly CYP450 3A4 (major route), but also by CYP2C9 (minor route) hepatic isoenzymes. The major product of metabolisation by these enzymes is N-desmethylated sildenafil, which is metabolised further. This metabolite also has an affinity for the PDE receptors, about 40% of that of sildenafil. Thus, the metabolite is responsible for about 20% of sildenafil's action. Sildenafil is excreted as metabolites predominantly in the feces (about 80% of administered oral dose) and to a lesser extent in the urine (around 13% of the administered oral dose).  If taken with a high-fat meal, absorption is reduced; the time taken to reach the maximum plasma concentration increases by around one hour, and the maximum concentration itself is decreased by nearly one-third.

Route of administration
 When taken by mouth sildenafil for erectile dysfunction results in an average time to onset of erections of 27 minutes (ranging from 12 to 70 minutes).
 Under the tongue use of sildenafil for erectile dysfunction results in an average onset of action of 15 minutes and lasting for an average of 40 minutes.

There are also mouth spray preparations of sildenafil for faster onset of action.

Chemical synthesis
The preparation steps for synthesis of sildenafil are:
 Methylation of 3-propylpyrazole-5-carboxylic acid ethyl ester with hot dimethyl sulfate
 Hydrolysis with aqueous sodium hydroxide (NaOH) to free acid
 Nitration with oleum/fuming nitric acid
 Carboxamide formation with refluxing thionyl chloride/NH4OH
 Reduction of nitro group to amino group
 Acylation with 2-ethoxybenzoyl chloride
 Cyclization
 Sulfonation to the chlorosulfonyl derivative
 Condensation with 1-methylpiperazine.

History
Sildenafil (compound UK-92,480) was synthesized by a group of pharmaceutical chemists led by Simon Campbell working at Pfizer's Sandwich, Kent, research facility in England. It was initially studied for use in hypertension (high blood pressure) and angina pectoris (a symptom of ischaemic heart disease). The first clinical trials were conducted in Morriston Hospital in Swansea.  Phase I clinical trials under the direction of Ian Osterloh suggested the drug had little effect on angina, but it could induce marked penile erections. Pfizer therefore decided to market it for erectile dysfunction, rather than for angina; this decision became an often-cited example of drug repositioning. The drug was patented in 1996, approved for use in erectile dysfunction by the FDA on 27 March 1998, becoming the first oral treatment approved to treat erectile dysfunction in the United States, and offered for sale in the United States later that year. It soon became a great success: annual sales of Viagra peaked in 2008 at US$1.934 billion.

Society and culture

Marketing and sales

In the US, even though sildenafil is available only by prescription from a doctor, it was advertised directly to consumers on TV (famously being endorsed by former United States Senator Bob Dole and football star Pelé). Numerous sites on the Internet offer Viagra for sale after an "online consultation", often a simple web questionnaire. The Viagra name has become so well known that many fake aphrodisiacs now call themselves "herbal viagra" or are presented as blue tablets imitating the shape and colour of Pfizer's product. Viagra is also informally known as "vitamin V", "the blue pill", or "blue diamond", as well as various other nicknames.

In 2000, Viagra sales accounted for 92% of the global market for prescribed erectile dysfunction pills. By 2007, Viagra's global share had plunged to about 50% due to several factors, including the entry of Cialis and Levitra, along with several counterfeits and clones, and reports of vision loss in people taking PDE5 inhibitors. In 2008, the FDA forced Pfizer to remove Viva Cruiser, an advergame for Viagra, from appearing on Forbes.com, after the game failed to disclose risk information about the drug.

In February 2007, it was announced that Boots, the UK pharmacy chain, would try over-the-counter sales of Viagra in stores in Manchester, England. Men between the ages of 30 and 65 would be eligible to buy four tablets after a consultation with a pharmacist. In 2017, the Medicines and Healthcare products Regulatory Agency (MHRA) enacted legislation that expanded this nationwide, allowing a particular branded formulation of Sildenafil, Viagra Connect (50 mg), to be sold over the counter and without a prescription throughout the UK from early 2018. While the sale remains subject to a consultation with a pharmacist, the other restrictions from the trial have been removed, allowing customers over the age of 18 to purchase an unlimited number of pills. The decision was made, in part, to reduce online sales of counterfeit and potentially dangerous erectile dysfunction treatments.

On 6 May 2013, Pfizer, which manufactures Viagra, told the Associated Press they will begin selling the drug directly to people on its website.

Pfizer's patents on Viagra expired outside the US in 2012; in the US they were set to expire, but Pfizer settled litigation with each of Mylan and Teva which agreed that both companies could introduce generics in the US on 11 December 2017. In December 2017, Pfizer released its own generic version of Viagra.

, the U.S. Food and Drug Administration has approved fifteen drug manufacturers to market generic sildenafil in the United States. Seven of these companies are based in India. This is likely to lead to dramatic price reductions.

Counterfeits

Counterfeit Viagra,  despite generally being cheaper, can contain harmful substances or substances that affect how Viagra works, such as blue printer ink, amphetamines, metronidazole, boric acid, and rat poison.

Viagra is one of the world's most counterfeited medicines. According to a Pfizer study, around 80% of sites claiming to sell Viagra were selling counterfeits.

Regional issues

Brazil
Pfizer's patent on sildenafil citrate expired in Brazil in 2010.

Canada
In Canada, Pfizer's patent 2,324,324 for Revatio (sildenafil used to treat pulmonary hypertension) was found invalid by the Federal Court in June 2010, on an application by Ratiopharm Inc.

On 8 November 2012, the Supreme Court of Canada ruled that Pfizer's patent 2,163,446 on Viagra was invalid from the beginning because the company did not provide full disclosure in its application. The decision, Teva Canada Ltd. v. Pfizer Canada Inc., pointed to section 27(3)(b) of The Patent Act which requires that disclosure must include sufficient information "to enable any person skilled in the art or science to which it pertains" to produce it. It added further: "As a matter of policy and sound statutory interpretation, patentees cannot be allowed to 'game' the system in this way. This, in my view, is the key issue in this appeal."

Teva Canada launched Novo-Sildenafil, a generic version of Viagra, on the day the Supreme Court of Canada released its decision. To remain competitive, Pfizer then reduced the price of Viagra in Canada. However, on 9 November 2012, Pfizer filed a motion for a re-hearing of the appeal in the Supreme Court of Canada, on the grounds that the court accidentally exceeded its jurisdiction by voiding the patent. Finally, on 22 April 2013, the Supreme Court of Canada invalidated Pfizer's patent altogether.

China
Manufacture and sale of sildenafil citrate drugs is common in China, where Pfizer's patent claim is not widely enforced.

Egypt
Egypt approved Viagra for sale in 2002, but soon afterwards allowed local companies to produce generic versions of the drug, citing the interests of poor people who would not be able to afford Pfizer's price.

European Union

Pfizer's patent on sildenafil citrate expired in some member countries of the EU, Austria, Denmark, France, Germany, Ireland, Italy, The Netherlands, Spain, Sweden, the United Kingdom and Switzerland on 21 June 2013.  A UK patent held by Pfizer on the use of PDE5 inhibitors (see below) as treatment of impotence was invalidated in 2000 because of obviousness; this decision was upheld on appeal in 2002.

India
Manufacture and sale of sildenafil citrate drugs known as "generic Viagra" is common in India, where Pfizer's patent claim does not apply. Trade names include Kamagra (Ajanta Pharma), Silagra (Cipla), Edegra (Sun Pharmaceutical), Penegra (Zydus Cadila), Manly (Cooper Pharma) and Zenegra (Alkem Laboratories).

New Zealand
Sildenafil was reclassified in New Zealand in 2014 so it could be bought over the counter from a pharmacist. It is thought that this reduced sales over the Internet and was safer as men could be referred for medical advice if appropriate.

South Korea
In 1999 South Korea granted two patents to Pfizer related to sildenafil. The first document guaranteed sole production and sale of the substance until 2012, while the second gave Pfizer the exclusive use to treating erectile dysfunction with sildenafil until 2014. In 2011 Hanmi Pharmaceutical and CJ CheilJedang launched a suit against the exclusive use patent. The Korean Court system made a ruling against Pfizer in June 2012, allowing for the unhindered domestic production of generic prescription sildenafil.

During 2012 Viagra lost its position as the top selling erectile dysfunction treatment in South Korea. This development was credited largely "due to the introduction of generic products." Generic sildenafil became publicly available in May. Sales of PalPal by Hanmi Pharmaceuticals totalled ₩22 billion or about 86% the market share of Viagra that year. By 2017 there were over 50 generic sildenafil pills available. During that year Viagra sales slumped to 38% that of Palpal.

United Kingdom
There were 2,958,199 prescriptions for Sildenafil in 2016 in England, compared with 1,042,431 in 2006.

In 2018, Viagra Connect, a particular formulation of Sildenafil marketed by Pfizer, became available for sale without a prescription in the UK, in an attempt to widen availability and reduce demand for counterfeit products.

United States
Sildenafil is available as a generic drug in the United States, labeled for pulmonary arterial hypertension.  branded pills cost about 50 times more than generic ones. In the United States  the branded 50 mg pill cost is between 25.17 and US$37.88.

In the United States, Pfizer received two patents for sildenafil: one for its indication to treat cardiovascular disease (marketed as Revatio) and another for its indication to treat erectile dysfunction (marketed as Viagra). The substance is the same under both trade names.

In 1992, Pfizer filed a patent covering the substance sildenafil and its use to treat cardiovascular diseases. This would be marketed as Revatio. The patent was published in 1993 and expired in 2012. The patent on Revatio (indicated for pulmonary arterial hypertension rather than erectile dysfunction) expired in late 2012. Generic versions of this low-dose form of sildenafil have been available in the U.S. from a number of manufacturers, including Greenstone, Mylan, and Watson, since early 2013. Health care providers may prescribe generic sildenafil for erectile dysfunction. For a time, the generic was not available in the same dosages as branded Viagra, so using dosages typically required for treating ED required patients to take multiple pills.

In 1994, Pfizer filed a patent covering the use of sildenafil to treat erectile dysfunction. This would be marketed as Viagra. This patent was published in 2002 and expired in 2019. Teva sued to have the latter patent invalidated, but Pfizer prevailed in an August 2011 federal district court case. An agreement with Pfizer allowed Teva to begin to provide the generic drug in December 2017.

References

External links 

 
 
 Viagra at The Periodic Table of Videos (University of Nottingham)

Erectile dysfunction drugs
Lactams
HERG blocker
PDE5 inhibitors
Pfizer brands
Phenol ethers
Piperazines
Products introduced in 1998
Pyrazolopyrimidines
Wikipedia medicine articles ready to translate